Livin' the Dream is the ninth studio album by English-Irish country singer Nathan Carter. It was released in Ireland on 16 June 2017 by Decca Records. The album peaked at number 1 on the Irish Albums Chart and number 51 on the UK Albums Chart. The album includes the single "Livin' the Dream".

Singles
"Livin' the Dream" was released as the lead single from the album on 16 March 2017.

Track listing

Charts

Release history

References

2017 albums
Nathan Carter albums